Montefranco is a comune (municipality) in the Province of Terni in the Italian region Umbria, located about 70 km southeast of Perugia and about 10 km northeast of Terni. As of 31 December 2004, it had a population of 1,329 and an area of 10.1 km2.

Montefranco borders the following municipalities: Arrone, Ferentillo, Spoleto, Terni.

Demographic evolution

References

Cities and towns in Umbria